Rudbar is a city in Rudbar County, Gilan Province, Iran.

Rudbar or Rud Bar may also refer to:
Rudbar of Alamut (Rudbar-i Alamut), former name of the Alamut region in Qazvin
Rudbar, Firuzabad, Fars Province
Rudbar, Sepidan, Fars Province
Rudbar-e Deh Sar, Gilan Province
Rudbar, Golestan, Golestan Province
Rudbar, Bastak, Hormozgan Province
Rudbar, Khamir, Hormozgan Province
Rudbar, Isfahan
Rudbar, Kerman
Rudbar, Rabor, Kerman Province
Rudbar, Mazandaran
Rudbar, Behshahr, Mazandaran Province
Rudbar-e Edru, Mazandaran Province
Rud Bar-e Firuz Ja, Mazandaran Province
Rudbar-e Kharkhun, Mazandaran Province
Rudbar Kola, Mazandaran Province
Rud Bar-e Later Gaz, Mazandaran Province
Rudbar-e Naqib Deh, Mazandaran Province
Rudbar, Qazvin, Qazvin Province
Rudbar-e Alamut District or Alamut-e Sharqi District, Qazvin Province
Rudbar-e Qasran District
Rudbar, Semnan, Semnan Province
Rudbarak-e Bala, Semnan Province
Rudbarak-e Pain, Semnan Province
Rudbar-e Jonubi County, in Kerman Province
Rudbar County, in Gilan Province
Rudbar Rural District (disambiguation)

See also
 Rudsar, Gilan Province
 Rudsar County, in Gilan Province
 Rudbar-e Aligudarz river,branch of Dez river.